Thamkharka Airport  is a domestic airport located in Khotehang serving Khotang District, a district in Province No. 1 in Nepal.

History
The airport was opened on 19 October 2001. The runway was blacktopped in 2019.

Facilities

Airlines and destinations

References

External links

Airports in Nepal
Buildings and structures in Khotang District
2001 establishments in Nepal